Camarena de la Sierra is a municipality located in the province of Teruel, Aragon, Spain. According to the 2004 census (INE), the municipality had a population of 166 inhabitants.

This town is located at the feet of the Sierra de Javalambre, Sistema Ibérico.

It is the birthplace of Cardinal Urbano Navarrete Cortés, S.J.

References 

Municipalities in the Province of Teruel